Sami Sanevuori (born 20 February 1986) is a Finnish former football player.

He was member of the Finland team in the 2003 FIFA U-17 World Championship, which were held in Finland.

References

1986 births
Living people
Finnish footballers
FC Inter Turku players
FC Lahti players
FC Haka players
Veikkausliiga players
Maskun Palloseura players
Association football fullbacks
People from Raisio
Sportspeople from Southwest Finland